Gadchiroli district (Marathi pronunciation: [ɡəɖt͡ʃiɾoliː]) is an administrative district in Maharashtra, India. The city of Gadchiroli is the administrative headquarters of the district.

Officer

Members of Parliament
Ashok Nete (BJP)

Guardian Minister

list of Guardian Minister

District Magistrate/Collector

list of District Magistrate / Collector

Extent and history
Maharashtra tapers in the east, where this district forms the south-east corner. The district is bordered by Gondia district to the north, Rajnandgaon, Kanker, Narayanpur and Bijapur districts of Chhattisgarh to the east, Jayashankar Bhupalpally district of Telangana to the south, and Mancherial and Komaram Bheem districts of Telangana and Chandrapur district to the west.

It was created on 26 August 1982 by the separation of Gadchiroli and Sironcha talukas from Chandrapur district.

Strategic planning
The district is currently a part of the Red Corridor.

Divisions
The district is divided into six revenue sub-divisions:Gadchiroli, Aheri,Chamorshi,Etapalli,Wadsa(Desaiganj),Kurkheda. These are each further divided into 2 taluka. Gadchiroli sub-division consists of Gadchiroli and Dhanora, Chamorshi sub-division consist of chamorshi and Mulchera talukas; Aheri sub-division consists of Aheri and Sironcha.Etapalli sub-division cover Etapalli and Bhamragad talukas; and Desaiganj (Wadsa) sub-division consists of Wadsa and Armori.Kurkheda sub-division consist of Kurkheda and Korchi talukas. There are 557 gram panchayats (village councils) and 1,688 Revenue Villages. The district has 12 panchayat samitis (local development-block governments). Only three municipalities, Gadchiroli, Wadsa (Desaiganj), and Armori exist in the district.

Following the delimitation of the constituencies in 2008, the district had three Vidhan Sabha (legislative assembly) constituencies: Gadchiroli, Armori and Aheri. All of these are part of the newly carved Gadchiroli-Chimur Lok Sabha constituency.

Natural geography
Established on 26 August 1982
The main river basin of the district is the Godavari, which flows west-to-east and forms the southern boundary of the district. The major tributaries of the Godavari are the Indravati and the Pranhita, the latter of which is formed by the confluence of the Wainganga and the Wardha near Chaprala village of Chamorshi taluka.

Dhanora, Etapalli, Aheri and Sironcha talukas in the eastern part of the district are covered by forest. Hills are found in Bhamragad, Tipagad, Palasgad and Surjagad area. The eastern part of Gadchiroli, bordering Chhattisgarh state, is mainly hilly and is tribal-dominated, similar to neighbouring Bastar region in Chhattisgarh.

Demographics

According to the 2011 census Gadchiroli district has a population of 1,072,942, roughly equal to the nation of Cyprus or the US state of Rhode Island. This gives it a ranking of 424th in India (out of a total of 640). Its population growth rate during 2001–2011 was 10.46%. Gadchiroli has a sex ratio of 975 females for every 1000 males, and a literacy rate of 70.55%. 11.00% of the population lived in urban areas. Scheduled castes and Scheduled Tribes made up 120,745 (11.25%) and 415,306 (38.71%) of the population respectively. Almost 85% of the tribals are Gonds, in particular the Madia Gonds.

Languages

At the time of the 2011 Census of India, 56.38% of the population in the district spoke Marathi, 23.68% Gondi, 8.87% Telugu, 5.12% Bengali, 2.15% Hindi and 1.69% Chhattisgarhi as their first language.

Marathi is the main language in the west of the district, while Chhattisgarhi is spoken in Korchi tehsil. Gondi is the dominant language in the eastern parts. Bengali is spoken by refugees in Mulchera tehsil. Telugu speakers are majority in Sironcha tehsil in the far south.

 it is the second-least-populous district of Maharashtra (out of 39), after Sindhudurg.

Economy
The district is categorised as tribal and undeveloped, with farming as the main occupation.  Forests cover more than 79.36% of the hilly geographical of the district. The district produces bamboo and Tendu leaves, and paddy is the main agricultural product. Other agriculture includes sorghum, linseed, pigeon pea (tur), and wheat.

The only large-scale industry in the district is a paper mill at Ashti in Chamorshi taluka and the paper pulp factory at Desaiganj. There are many rice mills in the district. The Tussar silk worm centre is in Armori taluka.  of railway lines pass through the district.

The district is known for activity of Naxalites – the People's Liberation Guerrilla Army – who have taken shelter in the dense forests and hills.

In 2006 the Ministry of Panchayati Raj named Gadchiroli among the country's 250 most-backward districts (out of a total of 640). It is one of the twelve districts in Maharashtra currently receiving funds from the Backward Regions Grant Fund Programme (BRGF).

Health

The Lok Biradari Prakalpa (LBP) situated at Hemalkasa in the Bhamragad taluka is one of the major institutions offering healthcare and education services to the local Madia Gond tribals. LBP was envisioned by the late Gandhian, Dr. Murlidhar Devidas Amte, fondly called Baba Amte. His family consisting of Dr. Prakash Amte, Dr. Mandakini Amte and their children currently work at the LBP.

Education
The government recently established Gondwana University on dated 27 September 2011 in Gadhchiroli district.

High schools 
•   Global media Kerala model E/M school,allapalli.

government English medium school gadchiroli 
Gondwana Sainiki Vidyalaya, Gadchiroli
Platinum Jubilee School and Junior College (Science), Gadchiroli
Shriniwas High School Ankisa
Dharmarao High School Sironcha
Republic English Medium School, Aheri
School Of Scholars, Gadchiroli
Rampuri Primary School
Shri. Shivaji High School, Gadchiroli
Z.P. High School, Gadchiroli
Carmel High School, Gadchiroli
Vasant Vidyalaya High School
Rani Durgavati High School & Junior College Allapalli
Netaji Subhash Chandra Jr. College, Sundernagar
Indira Gandhi Memoriyal High School & Junior College, Subhashgram
Mahatma Gandhi vidyalaya, Armori
Dr. Ambedkar vidyalaya, Armori
Hitakarani high school, Armori
Swami Vivekanda Vidyalaya, Armori
Adarsh English High school, Desaiganj (wadsa)
Mahatma Gandhi Vidyalaya, Desaiganj (Wadsa)
Dr. Babasaheb Ambedkar Vidyalaya, Desaiganj (Wadsa)
Pushpa Priya Devi High School & Junior science College Jimalgatta
Vianney Vidya Niketan (ICSE), Navegaon, Gadchiroli

Model school Aheri 
Platinum Jubilee School & Jr. College (science)
School Of Scholars, Gadchiroli
Shriniwas Junior College, Ankisa
Z. P. Junior College of Science Sironcha
Shivaji Junior Science College
Govt ITI Complex, Gadchiroli
Mahatma Gandhi junior college, Armori
N.S.C Jr. College Sundarnagar
Adarsh English High School & Junior College, Desaiganj (Wadsa)
Mahatma Gandhi Vidyalaya & Junior College, Desaiganj (Wadsa)

Senior (degree) colleges 
Bhagvantrao Arts College Sironcha
Shivaji Science College Gadchiroli
Mahila Mahavidyalaya, Gadchiroli
Government Science College, Gadchiroli
Government Polytechnic, Gadchiroli
College of Agriculture, Sonapur complex Gadchiroli
Model College ,Gadchiroli
Fule-Ambedkar College of Social Work, Gadchiroli
Mahatma Gandhi college, Armori
Chanakya Academy, Aheri & Alapalli (Competitive Exam Coaching Center)
Chanakya Academy, Police Physical Ground, Aheri
Adarsh Mahavidyalaya Art & Com. Desaiganj (Wadsa)
Sainath Adhayapak vidyalaya, Murkhala
Prof.Jogendra kawade college Vairagad
Shri govindrao Munghate Art and Science college kurkheda

Important places

 Wadadham Fossil Park, tah, Sironcha 
 Chaprala Wildlife Sanctuary
 Bhamragarh Wildlife Sanctuary
 Lok Biradari Prakalp, Hemalkasa
 Binagunda waterfall, Bhamragad 
 Tipagad, tah. Korchi 
 Khobramendha, tag dhanora 
 Bhandareshwar temple, tag Armori 
 Search hospital, Chatgaon 
 Desaiganj Wadsa, market place
 Markanda dev, Tah Chamorshi
 Somnur sangam tah, Sironcha 
 Pranhita Sangam tah, Sironcha
 Triveni sangam bhamragad

See also

Make In India
Chandrapur
Gondia
Nagpur

References

External links

 Official website
 Tourist place in Gadchiroli district
 Pincode of Gadchiroli

 
Districts of Maharashtra
Vidarbha
Nagpur division
Populated places established in 1982
1982 establishments in Maharashtra